Like many South American countries, the road signs in Brazil are strongly based on the US MUTCD standard, but with text in Portuguese. The regulatory, prohibitory and mandatory signs are all of them white circular with red borders, with the exception of the stop and the yield sign. The warning signs are yellow diamonds (or orange when used on road works). Units are expressed in compliance with the International System of Units.

Warning signs

Regulatory signs

Educational signs

Directional signs

External links
 Departamento Nacional de Infra-Estrutura de Transporte - Placas de Sinalização
 Placas de trânsito utilizadas no Brasil

Brazil
Road transport in Brazil